Hubbard is the name of some places in the U.S. state of Wisconsin:
Hubbard, Dodge County, Wisconsin, a town
Hubbard, Rusk County, Wisconsin, a town